The Never Ending Tour is the popular name for Bob Dylan's endless touring schedule since June 7, 1988.

Background
Six concerts taking place in the United Kingdom, across May 2017 were announced at BobDylan.com on December 8, 2016. The following day a concert at the 3Arena in Dublin was announced for May 11. Further mainland Europe concerts including Stockholm and Antwerp were announced on December 12.

On January 27, 2017, it was announced that Dylan would be performing at the fan-curated Firefly Music Festival, taking place at The Woodlands at Dover International Speedway in Dover, Delaware. On March 20, 2017, a further five concerts in the United States were announced, along with eighteen concerts taking place in Canada during the summer of 2017. These concerts include the first ever concert to take place at The Hutton Brickyards in Kingston, New York and Dylan's first concert appearance at Edmonton's new Rogers Place arena.

Set list
This set list is representative of the performance on July 25, 2017, in Vancouver, British Columbia. It does not represent the set list at all concerts for the duration of the tour.

"Things Have Changed"
"Don't Think Twice, It's All Right"
"Highway 61 Revisited"
"Why Try to Change Me Now"
"Summer Days"
"Make You Feel My Love"
"Duquesne Whistle"
"Melancholy Mood"
"Stormy Weather"
"Pay in Blood"
"Once Upon a Time"
"Tangled Up in Blue"
"Early Roman Kings"
"Desolation Row"
"Soon After Midnight"
"That Old Black Magic"
"Long and Wasted Years"
"Autumn Leaves"
Encore
"Blowin' in the Wind"
"Ballad of a Thin Man"

Tour dates

Cancelled shows

Personnel

Bob Dylan — Vocals, Piano
Tony Garnier — Bass Guitar, Double Bass
Donnie Herron — Pedal Steel, Banjo, Mandolin
Stu Kimball — Electric Guitar, Acoustic Guitar
George Receli — Drums
Charlie Sexton — Electric Guitar

Notes

References

External links
BobLinks – Comprehensive log of concerts and set lists
BobDylan.com – Bob Dylan's Official Website Tour Page
Bjorner's Still on the Road – Information on recording sessions and performances

Bob Dylan concert tours
2017 concert tours